Pat Lally may refer to:

Pat Lally (actor) British TV and Film Actor 
Pat Lally (footballer) (born 1952), English footballer
Pat Lally (politician) (1926–2018), Scottish politician